The 1988 United States presidential election in Illinois took place on November 8, 1988. All 50 states and the District of Columbia were part of the 1988 United States presidential election. State voters chose 24 electors to the Electoral College, which selected the president and vice president.

Illinois was won by incumbent United States Vice President George H. W. Bush of Texas, who was running against Massachusetts Governor Michael Dukakis. Bush ran with Indiana Senator Dan Quayle as Vice President, and Dukakis ran with Texas Senator Lloyd Bentsen.

Illinois weighed in for this election as 5.4% more Democratic than the national average. As of the 2020 presidential election, this was the last time that Illinois voted Republican in a presidential election. Bush won the election in rapidly liberalizing Illinois with a narrow 2-point margin. Like the neighboring state of Missouri, Bush's performance here was far below that of Reagan's just four years earlier. Bush's loss of many down-state rural counties, combined with Dukakis's stronger than normal performance across much of the state, especially in Cook County, which houses the Chicago area, made the election results in this state much closer than usual. 

The election results in Illinois are reflective of a nationwide reconsolidation of the base for the Republican Party, which took place through the 1980s. Through the passage of some economic programs, spearheaded by then President Ronald Reagan (called, collectively, "Reaganomics"), the mid-to-late 1980s saw a period of economic growth and stability. The hallmark of Reaganomics was, in part, the wide-scale deregulation of corporate interests, and tax cuts across the board.

Dukakis ran on a socially liberal platform, and advocated for higher economic regulation and environmental protection. Bush, alternatively, ran on a campaign of continuing the social and economic policies of former President Reagan – which gained him much support with social conservatives and people living in rural areas. The presidential election of 1988 was a very partisan election for Illinois, with more than 99% of the electorate voting for either the Democratic or Republican parties, and only five political parties listed as options on the ballot statewide. As of the 2020 presidential election, 1988 is the most recent election in which Peoria County and Champaign County voted for a Republican presidential candidate, as well as the last time a Republican candidate won more than 40% of the vote in Cook County, home to Chicago.

Bush became the first ever Republican to win the White House without carrying Henderson, Knox, Mercer, Putnam, or Vermillion Counties, as well as the first since Abraham Lincoln in 1864 to do so without carrying Williamson County, the first since James A. Garfield in 1880 to do so without carrying Saline County, the first since Benjamin Harrison in 1888 to do so without carrying LaSalle County, the first since William Howard Taft in 1908 to do so without carrying Calhoun, Cass, Hancock, Jefferson, Montgomery, or Perry Counties, the first since Calvin Coolidge in 1924 to do so without carrying Pike County, the first since Herbert Hoover in 1928 to do so without carrying Randolph County, and the first since Richard Nixon in 1968 to do so without carrying Christian, Fulton, Henry, Macon, Macoupin, Madison, or Pulaski Counties.

Election information
The primaries and general elections coincided with those for congress, as well as those for state offices.

Turnout
Turnout during the state-run primaries was 39.82%, with 2,359,737 votes cast.

Turnout during the general election was 71.72%, 4,559,120 votes cast.

Primaries
State-run primaries were held for the Democratic, Republican, parties on March 15.

Democratic

The 1988 Illinois Democratic presidential primary was held on March 15, 1988 in the U.S. state of Illinois as one of the Democratic Party's statewide nomination contests ahead of the 1988 presidential election.

Republican

The 1988 Illinois Republican presidential primary was held on March 15, 1988 in the U.S. state of Illinois as one of the Republican Party's statewide nomination contests ahead of the 1988 presidential election.

Illinois Solidarity

The 1988 Illinois Solidarity presidential primary was held on March 15, 1988, in the U.S. state of Illinois. Lenora Fulani won, running unopposed.

General election

Results

Results by county

See also
 Presidency of George H. W. Bush
 United States presidential elections in Illinois

References

Illinois
1988
1988 Illinois elections